The following are named after Paul Erdős:

 Paul Erdős Award of the World Federation of National Mathematics Competitions
 Erdős Prize
 Erdős Lectures

 Erdős number
 Erdős cardinal
 Erdős–Nicolas number
 Erdős conjecture — a list of numerous conjectures named after Erdős; See also List of conjectures by Paul Erdős.
 Erdős–Turán conjecture on additive bases
 Erdős conjecture on arithmetic progressions
 Erdős discrepancy problem
 Erdős distinct distances problem
 Burr–Erdős conjecture
 Cameron–Erdős conjecture
 Erdős–Faber–Lovász conjecture
 Erdős–Graham conjecture — see Erdős–Graham problem
 Erdős–Hajnal conjecture
 Erdós Institute

 Erdős–Gyárfás conjecture
 Erdős–Straus conjecture
 Erdős sumset conjecture
 Erdős–Szekeres conjecture
 Erdős–Turán conjecture
 Erdős–Turán conjecture on additive bases
 Copeland–Erdős constant
 Erdős–Tenenbaum–Ford constant
 Erdős–Bacon number
 Erdős–Borwein constant
 Erdős–Diophantine graph
 Erdős–Mordell inequality
 Chung–Erdős inequality
 Erdős–Rényi model
 Erdős space
 Erdős theorems
 de Bruijn–Erdős theorem (graph theory)
 de Bruijn–Erdős theorem (incidence geometry)
 Davenport–Erdős theorem
 Erdős–Anning theorem
 Erdős–Beck theorem
 Erdős–Dushnik–Miller theorem
 Erdős–Fuchs theorem
 Erdős–Gallai theorem
 Erdős–Ginzburg–Ziv theorem
 Erdős–Kac theorem
 Erdős–Ko–Rado theorem
 Erdős–Nagy theorem
 Erdős–Pósa theorem
 Erdős–Rado theorem
 Erdős–Stone theorem
 Erdős–Szekeres theorem
 Erdős–Szemerédi theorem
 Erdős–Tetali theorem
 Erdős–Wintner theorem
 Erdős–Turán inequality 
 Erdős–Ulam problem
 Erdős–Woods number
 Hsu–Robbins–Erdős theorem
 Erdős arcsine law
 Erdős–Moser equation

Erdos
Paul Erdős